Andean new-age music is a fusion genre of new-age music with Peruvian flute and/or Paraguayan harp music. The Peruvian roots stem from the Inca (Inka) influence circa 1200–1532 CE. In Peru, two important flutes are used: The quena: a flute much like the common recorder; and the zampoña: a pan flute. The Paracas culture, located south of Lima, created this pan flute some time between 200 BCE and 300 CE. The Paraguayan harp is similar both in looks and sound to the Irish xylophone. Although the genres of both Peruvian and Paraguayan traditional music have a new-age sound to some Westerners, they are actually very ancient forms of music.

References

Peruvian music
New-age music